Masaryk University (MU) is the second largest university in the Czech Republic, a member of the Compostela Group and the Utrecht Network. Founded in 1919 in Brno as the second Czech university (after Charles University established in 1348 and Palacký University existent in 1573–1860), it now consists of ten faculties and 35,115 students. It is named after Tomáš Garrigue Masaryk, the first president of an independent Czechoslovakia as well as the leader of the movement for a second Czech university.

In 1960 the university was renamed Jan Evangelista Purkyně University after Jan Evangelista Purkyně, a Czech biologist. In 1990, following the Velvet Revolution it regained its original name. Since 1922, over 171,000 students have graduated from the university.

History

Masaryk University was founded on 28 January 1919 with four faculties: Law, Medicine, Science, and Arts. Tomáš Garrigue Masaryk, professor of Charles University and later the first president of Czechoslovakia, contributed greatly to the establishment of Masaryk University. (Masaryk in his scientific and political activities paid attention to the development of Czechoslovak universities and since the 1880s he emphasized the need for broad competition in scientific work. In this context, he pointed out that the only Czech university at that time needed a competitive institution for its development.) The founding of the second Czech university was possible only after the fall of the Austro-Hungarian monarchy because of the resistance of the German-controlled city council, which feared giving power to the Czech residents of Brno. Brno was at that time a bilingual city. A notable demonstration in favour of establishing a university in Brno happened in 1905.

From the beginning, the university suffered from a lack of money for development. The fragile state of public finances in 1923–1925 and 1933–1934 led to proposals to abolish both the Faculty of Arts and the Faculty of Science. Both faculties eventually survived until 17 November 1939 when the whole university was closed following the German occupation of Czechoslovakia. A number of professors of Masaryk University were executed or tortured; for example, the Faculty of Science lost one quarter of its teaching staff. Many of the executions took place in the Mauthausen concentration camp in 1942.

The renewal of university life after the end of World War II was interrupted by the Communist takeover. The percentage of students expelled in various faculties ranged from 5 percent at the Faculty of Education to 46 percent at the Faculty of Law, which was completely closed in 1950. In 1953, the Faculty of Education (founded in 1946) was separated from the university. In August 1960, a government decree abolished the Pharmaceutical Faculty and the university was renamed Jan Evangelista Purkyně University in Brno.

Relaxation occurred in 1964 with the reintegration of the Faculty of Education into the university and with the reestablishment of the Faculty of Law in 1969. But conditions changed again rapidly with the Normalization of the 1970s after the 1968 invasion of Warsaw Pact troops into Czechoslovakia.

The university was renamed Masaryk University in Brno in 1990, then regaining its original name by dropping the "in Brno" from the title in 2006. A new era of development began after the Velvet Revolution of 1989 and the establishment of the Faculty of Economics and Administration in 1991, the Faculty of Informatics in 1994, the Faculty of Social Studies in 1998, and the Faculty of Sports Studies in 2002.

A new university campus has been under construction in Brno-Bohunice since 2002. The last stage of development should be completed in 2015. Campus houses most Faculty of Medicine, Faculty of Sports Studies, part of Faculty of Sciences as well as several research facilities such as Central European Institute of Technology and Research Centre for Toxic Compounds in the Environment Cetocoen.

In 2013, university signed a long-term lease with the city of Brno, creating University Cinema Scala in place of movie theatre with over 80 years tradition which was closed down in 2011. The place has various academic functions, hosting official university ceremonies as well as lectures and conferences. Cinema's programming is managed by Aeropolis, which shares the costs with the university.

Academics

Education 

As of 2014, Masaryk University has over 35,000 students and over 2,200 pedagogical staff and offers over 200 bachelor, 290 masters and 130 doctoral full-time study programs, some of them being offered in English or German as well as in combined form.

The Office of International Studies helps facilitate incoming and outgoing student mobility. In the 2012/13 academic year the university hosted over 1,000 international students. Students with special needs are assisted by the Teiresiás centre.

The university opened the Mendel Museum in 2007, creating an exhibition ground dedicated to the popularization of the scientific work and life of Gregor Johann Mendel who conducted his experiments in the Augustinian abbey where the museum is now located. The Mendel Lectures given by the world's top scientists in genetics, molecular biology, biochemistry, microbiology and medicine have been held in the Mendel Museum.

The University Cinema Scala has been operated by the Masaryk University since October 2013 as the first university cinema in the Czech Republic. The Freedom Lecture, a public debate on a current social topic with outstanding personalities has been held annually at the cinema on the occasion of International Students' Day (Student Seventeen) since 2014.

Research 

Masaryk University together with other institutions of higher education participate in CEITEC – a research centre for both basic and applied research in the field of life sciences.

The university owns and operates Mendel Polar Station in Antarctica. The station facilitates basic biological, geological and climatological research. The station was built in 2005 and 2006 and is staffed during Antarctic summers.

The Technology Transfer Office of Masaryk University was established in 2005 and aims to put research results into practice and support and facilitate cooperation between the scientific community and industry.

Grant Agency of Masaryk University 
Grant Agency of Masaryk University (GAMU) is an internal organizations of Masaryk University providing students, internal and external researchers and research teams with funding in all phases of their research career via the following grant schemes:

 HORIZONS - Support for Preparation of International Grant Projects
 INTERDISCIPLINARY Research Projects
 MASH - MUNI Award in Science and Humanities
 MASH JUNIOR - MUNI Award in Science and Humanities JUNIOR
 CAREER RESTART - Support for Integration of Researchers After a Career Break
 MUNI SCIENTIST - Award for Outstanding Research Results

The Agency aims to boost the scientific environment within the university and the South Moravian Region, to encourage interdisciplinary innovative research, to enhance the prestige of research outcomes and last but not least to increase its success rate in obtaining international prestigious grants.

Rankings 

The university is a highly research-intensive institution. It puts "a great deal of emphasis on international cooperation with prestigious foreign universities and [other] research institutions". The university has maintained its position within the world best 600 universities for years 2016–2018. Amongst all universities in the EU-countries joined the EU since 2004, Masaryk University was ranked at 7. According to a recent ranking by QS Students City, the Masaryk university shares fifth place worldwide with Berlin, Vienna, Stockholm and Amsterdam before New York, London and Sydney but behind Prague in the category "student's view".

Notable alumni
Masaryk University has over 170,000 alumni, some of the notable ones are listed here. The most accomplished scientists include astronomer Jiří Grygar and Luboš Kohoutek, mathematician Otakar Borůvka and František Wolf, psychiatrist Leo Eitinger, sociologist Miloslav Petrusek, paediatric geneticist Renata Laxova and anthropologist Jaroslav Malina. Paleontologist Josef Augusta, who together with illustrator Zdeněk Burian created accurate reconstructions representing all forms of prehistoric life. Neurologist Michal Vytopil also attended the university.

Alumni politicians include former Prime Minister of the Czech Republic Petr Nečas, former Governor of South Moravian Region Michal Hašek, former Minister of Health Tomáš Julínek or as of 2014, the leader of Czech Green Party Ondřej Liška. Politician, dissident, human rights activist Jaroslav Šabata also studied there. Martin Palouš is Permanent Representative to the United Nations of the Czech republic (2006– ), before he was Ambassador to the United States for the Czech Republic between 2001 and 2005.

Alumni also include director František Vláčil, playwright Milan Uhde, composer Antonín Tučapský and poets Jan Skácel and Ivan Blatný.

Athlete Šárka Kašpárková and ice hockey players Jiří Holík and Josef Augusta also attended the university.

Notable faculty
 Roman Jakobson (1896–1982) – linguist and literary theorist
 Jaroslav Krejčí (1892–1956) – lawyer and Prime Minister of Protectorate of Bohemia and Moravia
 Matyáš Lerch (1860–1922) – mathematician
 Eduard Čech (1893–1960) – mathematician
 Ladislav Skula (1937) – mathematician
 Arne Novák (1880–1939) – literary historian
 Antonín Bartoněk (1926–2016) – linguist (ancient Greek)
 Albert Kutal (1904–1976) – Art historian
 Emanuela Nohejlová-Prátová (1900–1995) – numismatist and museum curator
 Felix Maria Davídek (1921–1988) – Secret bishop (underground catholic church)
 František Vláčil 1924–1999) – Film director
 Bohuslav Sobotka (1971) – Lawyer, Prime Minister
 Petr Horálek (1986) – Astronomer, Astrophotographer, Artist
 Tomáš Špidlík (1919–2010) – cardinal, theologian-important thinker in 20th Catholicism, personal spiritual exorcist of Pope John Paul II.
 Zdeněk Měřínský (1948–2015) – archeologist

See also 
 List of modern universities in Europe (1801–1945)
 List of Czech universities

Footnotes

External links

 
 Masaryk University News Portal
 Masaryk University – study programs

 

 
Universities in the Czech Republic
Education in Brno
Organizations based in Brno
Educational institutions established in 1919
Public universities
Masaryk University Faculty of Law (Brno, 1919)
Buildings and structures in Brno
1919 establishments in Czechoslovakia